Inniscarra Dam is a buttress dam located on the River Lee in the civil parish of Inniscarra in County Cork, Ireland. Construction of the dam started in February 1953 and resulted in the formation of the Inniscarra Reservoir. The dam is owned and operated by the ESB Group and has a generation capacity of 19 MW. It over-flooded in November 2009 and caused around 100 million euros worth of damage to the city, with University College Cork saying it damaged 20 million euros worth of property.

References

Dams in the Republic of Ireland
Hydroelectric power stations in the Republic of Ireland
Buttress dams
Dams completed in 1957
River Lee